Chor Bazaar is a 2022 Indian Telugu-language romantic action film directed by B. Jeevan Reddy, and produced by I V Production. It stars Akash Puri, Gehna Sippy, Subbaraju, Sunil and Sampoornesh Babu. The music is composed by Suresh Bobbili.

Chor Bazaar was theatrically released on 24 June 2022.

Plot

Cast
Akash Puri as Bachchan Saab
Gehna Sippy
Subbaraju
Sunil
Sampoornesh Babu

Production

Development
Following the 2021 film Romantic, Akash Puri teamed up with director B. Jeevan Reddy under the banner I V Production for the film Chor Bazaar.

Filming
Principal photography was commenced in February 2021.

Music

The music rights of the film are sold to T-Series.The music of the film is composed by Suresh Bobbili.

The first single titled "Chor Bazaar Title Song" was sung by Sruthi Rajani and it was released by Ram Pothineni on 18 February 2022. Second single titled "Jada" was sung by Mittapalli Surendra and the song released by Vijay Deverakonda on 2 May 2022. 

Third single title "Noonugu Meesala" was sung by Kasarla Shyam ,Song was released by Samantha on 3 June 2022

Release
Chor Bazaar was theatrically released on 24 June 2022.

Reception
Calling it a "flop show", a reviewer from The Hans India wrote: "The routine story and narration, coupled with the lackluster screenplay and direction played the spoilsport." Sanju of Sakshi also criticized the screenplay and direction while appreciating Puri's performance. 

ABP Desam Saketh Reddy Eleti felt that the premise of diamond heist was interesting but the film was let down by poor execution. Writing for Samayam Telugu, Banda Kalyan also criticized the film for its writing and direction.

References

External links
 

2022 films
2020s Telugu-language films
Indian romantic action films
2020s romantic action films
Films shot in Hyderabad, India
Films set in Hyderabad, India
Indian heist films
2022 romance films